Hovey Manor, or Manoir Hovey  (in French) is a five-star, 37-bedroom, luxury hotel in North Hatley, Quebec, Canada.

Location 
The 37-bedroom hotel's grounds cover 35 acres and has a view of Lake Massawippi.

History 
The hotel was initially built as a summer home for Henry Atkinson, the owner of Georgia Power, in 1900. It was converted into a hotel in the 1950s, branded as The Birches, before being renamed Hovey Manor, named after local settler Colonel Ebenezer Hovey. Stephen and Katryn Stafford bought the hotel in 1979, employing the son Jason to manage it in 2000. The hotel is part of the Relais & Châteaux luxury hotel association.

Notable guests include Bill, Hillary, and Chelsea Clinton (2017 and 2021 visits), and Jacques Chirac and Bernadette Chirac (2003 visit).

In 2007, the hotel was named one of Canada's top ten hotels in Condé Nast Traveler's Gold List – the only rural property in Eastern Canada to have received the award. In 2014, it is ranked first among the Best Hotels in Eastern Canada in the Condé Nast Traveler: Readers' Choice Awards. In 2016, it was voted Canada's top hotel by both the readers of Condé Nast Traveler magazine, and by Travel & Leisure magazine. Both magazines also stated that the hotel was amongst the fifty best hotels in the world.

References

External links 

 

Hotels in Quebec
Buildings and structures in Estrie
Tourist attractions in Estrie
Buildings and structures completed in 1900
Five star hotels